Ligabueichnium is an ichnogenus of dinosaur footprint, probably made by ankylosaurs.

See also

List of dinosaur ichnogenera

References

Bibliography

Dinosaur trace fossils
Ankylosaurs